Glycidol is an organic compound that contains both epoxide and alcohol functional groups.  Being bifunctional, it has a variety of industrial uses.  The compound is a slightly viscous liquid that is slightly unstable and is not often encountered in pure form.

Synthesis and applications
Glycidol is prepared by the epoxidation of allyl alcohol.

Glycidol is used as a stabilizer for natural oils and vinyl polymers and as a demulsifier. It is used as a chemical intermediate in the synthesis of glycerol, glycidyl ethers, esters and amines. It is used in surface coatings, chemical synthesis, pharmaceuticals, sanitary chemicals and sterilizing milk of magnesia, and as a gelation agent in solid propellants.

Alkylation of 2-methylquinazolin-4(3H)-one with glycidol affords diproqualone.
Dyphylline was made by the alkylation of theophylline with glycidol.
Diproxadol

Safety
Glycidol is an irritant of the skin, eyes, mucous membranes, and upper respiratory tract. Exposure to glycidol may also cause central nervous system depression, followed by central nervous system stimulation.  It is listed as an IARC Group 2A Agent, meaning that it is "probably carcinogenic to humans". In regards to occupational exposures, the Occupational Safety and Health Administration has set a permissible exposure limit at 50 ppm over an eight-hour work shift, while the National Institute for Occupational Safety and Health recommends a limit at 25 ppm over an eight-hour work shift.

Refined edible oils have been shown to contain glycidyl fatty acid esters that are thought to be formed primarily during deodorization; hydrolysis of these compounds in the digestive tract releases free glycidol that proved to be carcinogenic in rats.

See also
 Epichlorohydrin
 Ethylene oxide
 Glycidamide
 Glycidic acid

References

Epoxides
Primary alcohols
IARC Group 2A carcinogens